The Yilan Literary Museum is a museum in Yilan City, Yilan County, Taiwan.

History
The museum building was originally a principal's quarter of a school of agriculture. Later it was turned into Yilan Music Museum and then Yilan Literary Museum. It was declared a historical building in 2001 and was renovated in 2004.

Architecture
The museum was constructed with Japanese architectural style. It consists of two buildings, which are the principal's quarter of the former school of agriculture and the old secretary-general mansion building. Currently the old secretary-general mansion building is used as the Kyukoku Restaurant.

Transportation
The museum is accessible within walking distance west of Yilan Station of Taiwan Railways.

See also
 List of museums in Taiwan

References

Museums in Yilan County, Taiwan
Literary museums in Taiwan